Martti Pennanen (8 December 1923; Tervola, Finland – 17 December 2010; Tampere, Finland) was a Finnish film and stage actor.
 
Pennanen began acting relatively late in life in his late 40s in 1970 and has made many appearances in Finnish film throughout the 1970s and 1980s, appearing in many films such as the 1983 James Bond spoof Agent 000 and the Deadly Curves where he acted alongside actors Ilmari Saarelainen and Tenho Sauren. However, after 1990 he has appeared only on television in Finland retiring in 1999 at the age of 76.

Pennanen was married.

References

External links

1923 births
2010 deaths
People from Tervola
20th-century Finnish male actors
Finnish male film actors
Finnish male television actors